Antonioli is an Italian surname. Notable people with the surname include:

 Claudio Antonioli (born 1962), retired Italian racing driver
 Dan Antonioli (born 1960), builder and owner of two evolving intentional communities
 Fausto Antonioli (1814–1882), Italian painter
 Francesco Antonioli (born 1969), Italian footballer and goalkeeper
 Jean-François Antonioli (born 1959), Swiss pianist, conductor and piano pedagogue
 Laurie Antonioli (born 1958), American jazz singer and record producer
 Michele Antonioli (born 1977), Italian short track speed skater
 Robert Antonioli (born 1990), Italian ski mountaineer
 Roberto Antonioli (born c. 1922), Italian rugby union and professional rugby league footballer

See also

Antonioni (surname)
Tonioli

References

Italian-language surnames
Patronymic surnames
Surnames from given names